Carson City Correctional Facility (DRF) is a Michigan prison, located in Carson City, for adult male prisoners.

History
The prison was opened in 1989. In 1997, two gun towers were added to the facility to enhance security.

On August 9, 2009, Boyer Road Correctional Facility was consolidated into Carson City Correctional Facility.

Facility
The prison has seven housing units used for Michigan Department of Corrections male prisoners 18 years of age and older. A 120-bed unit houses Level I (low security) prisoners. Three units, with 720 beds total, house Level II prisoners. Two units, with 384 beds total, house Level IV prisoners. There is also one housing unit with 22 beds used for segregating inmates from the general prison population. All housing units, except the one used for segregating prisoners, use bunk beds.

Security
The facility is surrounded by double fences with razor-ribbon wire and two gun towers. Electronic detection systems and patrol vehicles are also utilized to maintain perimeter security.

Services
The facility offers education programs and Level I prisoners may work, under supervision, on public work assignments in the area. Onsite medical and dental care is supplemented by local hospitals and the Duane L. Waters Hospital in Jackson, Michigan.

See also

 List of Michigan state prisons

References

External links
 
 Michigan Department of Corrections

Prisons in Michigan
Buildings and structures in Montcalm County, Michigan
1989 establishments in Michigan